Fivemile Creek is a stream in Newton County, Missouri and Ottawa County, Oklahoma in the United States. It is a tributary of the Spring River in northeastern Oklahoma.

The stream flows to the northwest and passes under Missouri Route 43 just south of the community of Hornet. It passes into the northeast corner of Oklahoma and under I-44. It turns to the southwest, flows past the community of Five Mile and enters the Spring River approximately 2.5 miles south of Baxter Springs, Kansas.

However, the headwaters of the stream are approximately nine miles northwest of Neosho and it flows to the northwest away from the city.

See also
List of rivers of Missouri
List of rivers of Oklahoma

References

Rivers of Newton County, Missouri
Rivers of Ottawa County, Oklahoma
Rivers of Missouri
Rivers of Oklahoma